Bedford & Milton Keynes Waterway Trust is an organisation formed in 1995 to promote a new waterway park, the Bedford and Milton Keynes Waterway Park.

It is a registered charity in England, and in 2008 had a gross income of £201,287.

The Trust was established in 1995 to promote the development of a broad canal which will link the Grand Union Canal in Milton Keynes to the River Great Ouse in Bedford through a series of waterways parks. The planned route of the new canal runs from the Grand Union Canal at Campbell Park in Milton Keynes (close to Gulliver's Land), crosses the M1 motorway between Junction 13 and 14, runs near to Brogborough Hill, through Marston Vale and connects with the River Great Ouse at Kempston.

In 2003 British Waterways announced its long-term aim to build the connection from the Grand Union at Milton Keynes to the River Great Ouse at Bedford in conjunction with a number of partner organisations.

The Trust has carried out design work on the project, funded through a £250,000 Lottery grant. The canal project suffered an apparent setback in 2004 when Milton Keynes Council did not include the route in the Supplementary Planning Guidance for the Eastern Expansion Area of Milton Keynes. However, this decision was recalled as a result of a public petition, and reversed at the subsequent meeting. The route within Milton Keynes is now protected by the SPG, and this episode serves to show public as well as political support for the scheme.

The first new structure specifically constructed for the waterway was completed in September 2009 – a  concrete culvert (Berry Farm A421 Underpass) incorporated into the A421 road as the result of £250,000 provided through Government Growth Area Funds. The road opened on 1 December 2010, although the underpass was not due to open for public access until sometime into 2011.

One of the more speculative plans by the Trust is the "Brogborough Whirl" a proposed boat lift to take the waterway  up and down the eastern side of Brogborough Hill.

See also

 List of waterway societies in the United Kingdom
 Waterscape

References

External links
 
 Youtube video by B&MKWT
 The Guardian: "First British canal for 100 years announced"
 Highways Agency response to a query about widening the Berry Farm Underpass to allow for the canal (made under the 'Freedom of Information Act') 

Transport in Bedfordshire
Transport in Milton Keynes
Waterways organisations in England
Organisations based in Bedford
Charities based in Bedfordshire
1995 establishments in England
Organizations established in 1995